Keith Carter may refer to:

Keith Carter (basketball) (born 1976), American basketball player and college athletics administrator
Keith Carter (comedian) (born 1969), English comedian, writer, and actor
Keith Carter (gymnast) (born 1952), Canadian Olympic gymnast
Keith Carter (photographer) (born 1948), American photographer, educator, and artist
Keith Carter (swimmer) (1924–2013), American swimmer
Keith Carter (American football), American football coach and tight end
Big Kap (real name Keith Carter, 1970–2016), American hip hop DJ